Yanshi railway station is a station on Longhai railway in Yanshi District, Luoyang, Henan.

History
The station was established in 1908 together with the Kaifeng-Luoyang section of Longhai railway.

References

Railway stations in Henan
Stations on the Longhai Railway
Railway stations in China opened in 1908